Typhoon Dinah, known as Typhoon Luding in the Philippines, was the fourth typhoon to form during August 1987. An area of low pressure developed near Guam on August 19, and two days later, the low reached tropical storm intensity as it moved generally west. Intensification was initially gradual, with Dinah becoming a typhoon early on August 24, before it subsequently intensified at a faster pace. Dinah reached its highest strength on August 26 before turning northward on August 28 and into a less favorable conditions aloft, which prompted weakening. Dinah entered the Sea of Japan after passing near Okinawa on August 29, where Dinah leveled off in intensity. The system then began to recurve towards southwestern Japan, and after tracking through the area, Dinah transitioned into an extratropical cyclone on August 31, although the remnants could be traced for four more days as it approached the International Date Line.

Across Okinawa, one person was killed, and six more were injured; eight homes were destroyed or seriously damaged, and 13 boats sunk or were damaged. Damage exceeded $1.3 million (1987 USD). On the island of Kyushu, 250 homes were flooded and about 450,000 homeowners lost power. Throughout Japan, eight people perished, damage totaled $604 million and 89 were wounded. The typhoon destroyed nearly 40,000 dwellings and an additional 600 were flooded. In South Korea, 4,372 structures were destroyed, leaving more than 11,000 people homeless. Nationwide, the typhoon was responsible for flooding  of crops. Property damage was estimated at $39.1 million.

Meteorological history

The origins of Typhoon Dinah can be traced back to a poorly organized area of disturbed weather that formed on August 18 close to Guam and was embedded in the monsoon trough, at the time situated near the equator. At 06:00 UTC on August 19, the Joint Typhoon Warning Center (JTWC) started tracking the system, as the system started to show signs of organization. Shortly thereafter, a low pressure area developed along the axis of the system, prompting the JTWC to issue a Tropical Cyclone Formation Alert and the Japan Meteorological Agency (JMA) to start keeping an eye on the low. Late on August 20, there was a rapid increase in the coverage of the thunderstorm activity, and satellite intensity estimates via the Dvorak Technique reached T2.0/. Based on this, the JTWC upgraded the system into a tropical depression at 00:00 UTC on August 21.

Shortly after the upgrade, the depression began to turn west in response to a subtropical high to its north. The system then moved beneath an upper-level high, resulting in improved outflow and decreased wind shear. Following an increase in Dvorak classifications, the JTWC classified the depression as Tropical Storm Dinah on the evening of August 21. Early the following day, the JMA also upped the cyclone into a tropical storm. Midday on August 23, the JMA declared Dinah a severe tropical storm. Shortly after the upgrade, Dinah began to enter an area of lower shear, which accelerated intensification. After turning west-northwest and an increase in the storm's Dvorak intensity estimates, both the JTWC and JMA upgraded Dinah into a typhoon on the morning of August 24. Despite a brief increase in shear, Dinah began to rapidly intensify over the ensuing 24 hours. Around this time, the Philippine Atmospheric, Geophysical and Astronomical Services Administration (PAGASA) also monitored the storm and assigned it with the local name Luding.

Typhoon Dinah's forward speed then began to slow as the storm approached a weakness in the ridge. Midday on August 28, Dinah began to turn north as it rounded the high. This change in the storm's direction led to the storm encountering stronger wind shear from a series of shortwave troughs that passed north of the storm, which redistricted the typhoon's outflow. Dinah then leveled off in intensity as the storm entered the Sea of Japan, and on August 30, Dinah began to recurve to the north-northeast. By 00:00 UTC on August 31, Dinah began to merge with a frontal zone near the polar jet stream. Several hours later, the JTWC stopped monitoring the system as it completed its extratropical transition, but the JMA continuing to track the extratropical remnants of Dinah until September 3, when it crossed the International Date Line.

Preparations and impact
The capital of Okinawa, Naha, recorded  of rain, including  during one day; both of these totals were the highest reported across Japan. All ferry and airline service to Japan from Naha was halted. Throughout the capital of Okinawa, 13 fishing boats were damaged and three houses were destroyed. Throughout Okinawa, six people were injured, including one who required brief hospitalization from cuts as a result of flying glass. Police reported that eight houses were seriously damaged or destroyed. One person was killed and damage exceeded $1.3 million. Offshore, a  ferry also sank, and a  vessel and another ferry went aground. In all, Dinah was considered the worst tropical cyclone to affect Okinawa in 20 years.

Along Kyushu, 250 homes were flooded and about 450,000 homeowners lost power. Off the coast of Kyushu, a  vessel went aground and 41 boats were sunk. Throughout southwestern Japan, storm surge resulted in extensive damage to seawalls and piers. Damage to United States military bases in the archipelago totaled $6.7 million. Nationwide, 37,0768 homes were destroyed, with 611 others flooded. Eight people perished, and 89 others were hurt. Damage in Japan amounted to $604 million.

Although Typhoon Dinah did not directly strike South Korea, the storm inundated much of the country, which was already affected by Typhoon Thelma six weeks earlier. The storm forced closure of 2,312 schools. Nationwide,  33 people were killed, 52 were unaccounted for, a total of 432 structures received flooded, and 4,372 buildings were destroyed, resulting in over 11,000 people homeless. Overall, the typhoon deluged  of crops. Property damage was assessed at $39.1 million.

See also

Typhoon Hal (1985)
Typhoon Hinnamnor (2022) – had a similar track to Dinah

Notes

References

1987 in Japan
1987 in South Korea
1987 Pacific typhoon season
Typhoons
Typhoons in Japan
Typhoons in South Korea
Dinah
1987 disasters in Asia